is a British-born Japanese actress, voice actress and singer. She appeared on an episode of the Showtime series Masters of Horror. Kimura won the "Rookie of the Year" prize at the 21st Japan Academy Awards for her appearance in Shitsurakuen.

Career
Kimura appeared as Shizuka in the recent spaghetti-western Sukiyaki Western Django. As of 25 June 2007 she was slated to star in a new Japanese soap opera to be set in Australia.   Kimura also voiced Master Tigress in the Japanese dub of Kung Fu Panda and Kung Fu Panda 2. She also appears in Blindness as the First Blind Man's Wife. On 24 October 2010 she married Noriyuki Higashiyama.

In 2007, Kimura took the title role in a TV Asahi tanpatsu (単発, TV movie), entitled Teresa Teng Monogatari (テレサ・テン物語), portraying the late Taiwanese superstar, who was (and continues to be) popular throughout Asia.

She played Kazusa Monzen and Aoi Monzen in the 2008 film Orochi: Blood.

She also did the voice of Claire Folley in the game Professor Layton and the Unwound Future.

Filmography

Films
Lost Paradise (1997) – Chika
Isola (2000) – Yukari Kamo
Hashire! Ichirō (2001) – Terada
Atlantis: The Lost Empire (2001) – Princess Kida
Mobōhan (2002) – Shigeko Maehata
Her Island, My Island (2002) – Kuriko
Like Asura (2003) – Keiko Akagi
Ichigo no Kakera (2005)
Bluestockings (2005) – Kiyoko
The Samurai I Loved (2005) – Fuku
Nezu no Ban (2006) – Shigeko
Backdancers! (2006) – Reiko Mihama
Sakuran (2006) – Takao
Glory to the Filmmaker! (2007) – Akiko
Densen Uta (2007) – Ranko Kaburagi
Sukiyaki Western Django (2007) – Shizuka
Fine, Totally Fine (2008) – Akari Kinoshita
Aibō the Movie (2008) – Hinako Katayama
Jirochô Sangokushi (2008) – Osono
Orochi: Blood (2008) – Aoi Monzen, Kazusa Monzen
Blindness (2008) – First Blind Man's Wife
Rescue Wings (2008) – Mina Takasu
Daremo Mamotte Kurenai (2008) – Reiko Onoue
Killer Bride's Perfect Crime (2009) – Fukuko Kobayashi
Confessions (2010) – Yuko Shimomura
King Game (2010) – Yamazaki
Aibō Series X DAY (2013) – Hinako Katayama
Hot Road (2014) – Kazuki's mother
Hoshigaoka Wonderland – Sawako Kiyokawa
Desperate Sunflowers (2016) – Natsuko Kotani
Pretty Cure Dream Stars! (2017) - Shizuku (voice)
My Dad is a Heel Wrestler (2018) - Shiori
Hit Me Anyone One More Time (2019) - the president of the United States
Diner (2019)
The Legacy of Dr. Death: Black File (2020)
Kiba: The Fangs of Fiction (2021)
First Love (2021)
Masquerade Night (2021)

Television
Shota no Sushi (1996) – Saori Otori
Remote (2002) – Yuka Sasaki
Aibō (2004) – Hinako Katayama
Masters of Horror, "Dream Cruise" (2007) – Yuri Saito
Tenchijin (2009) – Oryō
Nakanai to Kimeta Hi (2010) – Yukiko Sano
Asa ga Kita (2015) – Soe Kushida
Sanada Maru (2016) – Matsu
Hiyokko (2017) – Miyoko Yatabe
Home Sweet Tokyo (2017) – Itsuki Jenkins 
Dokonimo nai Kuni (2018) – Mariko Maruyama
Reach Beyond the Blue Sky (2021) – Hiraoka Yasu

Dubbing
Atlantis: The Lost Empire (2001) – Princess Kida
Open Season (2006) – Beth
Kung Fu Panda (2008) – Master Tigress
Percy Jackson & the Olympians: The Lightning Thief (2010) – Medusa (voice-over for Uma Thurman)
Kung Fu Panda 2 (2011) – Master Tigress
Paddington (2014) – Millicent Clyde (voice-over for Nicole Kidman)
Jurassic World (2015) – Claire Dearing (voice-over for Bryce Dallas Howard)
Jurassic World: Fallen Kingdom (2018) – Claire Dearing (voice-over for Bryce Dallas Howard)
Godzilla: King of the Monsters (2019) – Dr. Emma Russell (voice-over for Vera Farmiga)
Jungle Cruise (2021) – Dr. Lily Houghton (voice-over for Emily Blunt)
Turning Red (2022) – Ming Lee
Jurassic World Dominion (2022) – Claire Dearing (voice-over for Bryce Dallas Howard)

Discography

Albums 
 1999.03.03 "One and Only" 
 2000.04.20 "Girl"  
 2001.09.19 "Lady -The Best of Yoshino Kimura-"

Singles 
 1998.06.17 "Iruka no Natsu"
 1998.09.18 "Love and Life"
 1999.01.20 "Hello myself"
 1999.12.01 "Amenohi wa Futari de"
 2000.03.17 "Koisuru Nichiyobi"
 2000.09.06 "Lullaby for Grandmother-M Version-"

Accolades

References

External links
Official website 

1976 births
Living people
Actresses from London
Japanese expatriates in the United Kingdom
Japanese film actresses
Japanese television actresses
Japanese women pop singers
Japanese video game actresses
Japanese voice actresses
English film actresses
English television actresses
English women pop singers
English video game actresses
English voice actresses
Pony Canyon artists
Singers from Tokyo
Voice actresses from Tokyo
20th-century Japanese actresses
20th-century Japanese women singers
20th-century Japanese singers
20th-century English actresses
20th-century English women singers
20th-century English singers
21st-century Japanese actresses
21st-century Japanese women singers
21st-century Japanese singers
21st-century English actresses
21st-century English women singers
21st-century English singers